Sunbury-on-Thames (or commonly Sunbury) is a suburban town on the north bank of the River Thames in the Borough of Spelthorne, Surrey, centred  southwest of central London. Historically part of the county of Middlesex, in 1965 Sunbury and other surrounding towns were initially intended to form part of the newly created county of Greater London but were instead transferred to Surrey. Sunbury adjoins Feltham to the north, Hampton to the east, Ashford to the northwest and Shepperton to the southwest. Walton-on-Thames is to the south, on the opposite bank of the Thames.

The town has two main focal points: Lower Sunbury (known locally as Sunbury Village) is the older part, adjoining the river. Sunbury Common (known locally as Sunbury Cross) is to the north and surrounds the railway station and the London end of the M3 motorway. Lower Sunbury contains most of the town's parks, pubs and listed buildings, whereas Sunbury Common is more urban and includes offices and hotels. Lower Sunbury holds an annual fair and regatta each August.

Sunbury railway station is on the Shepperton branch line. Trains to and from London Waterloo are operated by South Western Railway.

History

 
The earliest evidence of human settlement in Sunbury has been the discovery of Bronze Age funerary urns dating from the 10th century BCE. There is an important scheduled monument by Rooksmead Road, a prehistoric bowl barrow, known as Cloven Barrow, on low-lying ground that was part of the flood plain of the Thames, now around 1 km to the south. It has a circular mound approximately 14 m in diameter and 2.5 m high, surrounded by a ditch from which material used to build it was excavated. The ditch has become infilled over the years and survives as a buried feature up to 2 m wide. The monument has been partly disturbed by modern gardening activities, and by the construction of a greenhouse on its western side. Cloven Barrow (Old English Clofenan Beorh, or the 'barrow with a cleft') was mentioned in an Anglo-Saxon document, known as the Sunbury Charter, which has been dated to around AD 962.

Many years later the arrival of Huguenot refugees gave the name to French Street.

Another charter of 962 lists it as Sunnanbyrig. Sunbury appears in the Domesday Book of 1086 as Sunneberie. The name means 'Sunna's burgh or fortification'. The same first name is found in Sonning in Berkshire.

Sunbury's Domesday assets were: seven hides. It had five ploughs, meadow for six ploughs, and cattle pasture. It had about 22 households, including one priest and included the manor of Kempton, Kynaston, Chennes[-ton]/[-tone], Kenton or Kenyngton, listed separately. The manor rendered £6 per year to its feudal system overlords. That of Kempton rendered £4.

Lower Sunbury presented for two centuries a mainly rural and quite gentrified village as still visible in many conserved buildings and structures, see Landmarks. Of particular note are the wealth and community tie of its parish church as well as many ornate and unusual houses and mansions (or mansion remains). The oldest and most extravagant homes are those from the Georgian era: throughout and for three decades after the 18th century, the time when the body of Sunbury's oldest church dates to – many of those on large plots of land have been demolished and subdivided.

 Gilbert White described Sunbury, in The Natural History of Selborne, letter , 4 November 1767 as "one of those pleasant villages lying on the Thames, near Hampton Court".

In 1889 a group of music hall stars met in the Magpie Hotel in Lower Sunbury to form the Grand Order of Water Rats. The pub-restaurant it has become was named after the horse that one of the entertainers owned, whilst the Grand Order was named because Magpie – a trotting pony owned by Richard Thornton, music hall owner – had been described as a drowned water rat. The Three Fishes in Green Street is one of the oldest pubs in Surrey, an officially protected building of the late 16th century.

In the twentieth century, kennels near Sunbury Cross in the town were used for keeping greyhounds for racing at the disbanded stadiums of Wandsworth, Charlton and Park Royal.

Sunbury-on-Thames is historically in Middlesex. Under the Local Government Act 1888 county councils were established the following year, with Sunbury governed by the new Middlesex County Council. This was further refined by the creation of Sunbury-on-Thames Urban District in 1894. In 1965, all but three districts of Middlesex were absorbed into Greater London; Sunbury was one of these exceptions. The area of Sunbury's Urban District has since been in the county of Surrey as to its upper tier of local government. Royal Mail ignored the change in 1965 and the former postal county is Middlesex. Mention of any county in postal addresses is considered dated but widely practised in some areas. In 1974 the urban district was abolished and it has since formed part of the borough of Spelthorne.

Topography and localities

Sunbury is a post town that is in part north and south of the M3, varying from 14 to 9m AOD with a term for each part.

Lower Sunbury
Lower Sunbury, locally known as 'Sunbury village', bordering the Thames and M3, is just over half of the town forming an almost entirely green-buffered residential suburb which includes eight schools: including three of the six secondary schools in the Borough (or of eight including those which are independent). Opposed to London, partially in Shepperton are parts of the Metropolitan Green Belt including four farms, a golf course, riverside horseriding centre at Beasley's Ait, the Swan Sanctuary, a rugby training centre and Upper Halliford's park. Lower Sunbury has one of the larger NHS medical general practitioner (GP) centres in the Borough. Football, playgrounds and tennis grounds are in both halves of the town with London Irish rugby club being the main organised team in the village. Sunbury Park has dog-walking, cycle paths, parking and is in a cluster with five others including a tree-lined linear park, a modest, sloped riverside park and an adjoining café-served park.

The town has been the home to London Irish since 1932 whose premiership team since 2001 has played at the Madejski Stadium in Reading, Berkshire. Many hundreds of players train at Sunbury during the rugby season. Its eastern border is Kempton Park Racecourse which has on the far side of the town the main area of historic woodland and wildlife preservation, the Kempton Park Reservoirs SSSI which blends into the park's own ponds, woods, Portman Brook and additional channels in the Green Belt.

The neighbourhood has a tapestry known as the Millennium Embroidery which was conceived and designed in the 1990s and completed in 2000. Since July 2006 its permanent home is the purpose-built Sunbury Millennium Embroidery Gallery, in a well-tended, free-to-visit Walled Garden adjoining Sunbury Park. The opening of a café within the gallery building, which architecturally resembles a boat, has increased the leisure time spent in the predominantly Georgian and early Victorian conservation area, the majority of which runs along Thames Street, a small section of which King's Lawn is a terraced public riverside. Fishing is permitted here for those with two Environment Agency licences. The Walled Garden hosts annual concerts, flower displays, events related to its facing Millennium Embroidery Café and occasionally plays in summer. Three public pools attract swimmers: Nuffield Health; You Fit (next to the Shepperton border); and Everyone Active's Sunbury Leisure Centre.

In July of each year, Lower Sunbury is the start of the colourful traditional ceremony of Swan Upping, where two livery companies carry out marking of the swans on all upper reaches of the River Thames. In August, the traditional Sunbury Amateur Regatta takes place on the stretch of the river around Rivermead Island.

Lower Sunbury has similar property plot sizes to Shepperton and house prices as Hampton. Most property is 1930s–1960s semi-detached or detached houses with gardens on verge or tree-lined roads. The railway here benefits from seating at peak times but gives lower speed of access to the City of London relative to the South West Main Line developments of Elmbridge. Wide roads and parking provide strengths of the borough. The largest plots of garden measure only around an acre not covering any of the grassy plain, western outlying farms or boundary-lining trees in the far east and west. Lower Sunbury has numerous pubs, independent restaurants. A dog-free meadow permitting informal cricket and football is near the main parade of shops at which annual carols are held and at the regatta time in August a celebratory street market takes place.

Sunbury Common

The northern section is Sunbury Common, patches of which remain, commanded by its four tower blocks and two hotels, overall with a mixed-use urban composition; it also houses major employers including offices of Siemens, European Asbestos Solutions, Chubb and BP. The M3, with its inaugural junction at Sunbury Cross, sections off Lower Sunbury. Sunbury Common has a long, curved shopping parade that includes a sports store, jewellery shop, Marks & Spencer, Halfords, Laura Ashley and Farmfoods supermarket. Also in this area, set off the main road is a Tesco Extra.

North and east of the area is part of the green belt: a small farm and larger natural brookland habitat with most of this area being in the adjoining London Borough of Hounslow and before the early 19th century part of distant Hanworth Park, historically part of Hounslow Heath. Its wild flower meadows, brooks and man-made troughs with wetland plants and insects form the Kempton Park Reservoirs SSSI. The operational Kempton Reservoirs and roads passing into Hampton form the rest of the town's eastern border, a buffer further south.

Sunbury here has five or six high rise tower blocks: 3 residential including the newly converted chubb building; and two hotels. Similarly it has industrial/business parks clustered generally in the acute angles between the M3/A316 (Country Way) and the A308 (Staines Road West). BP's Engineering and Research Centre in the north replaced Meadhurst House and gardens occupied by the Cadbury family and has evolved into BP's international centre for business and technology across a number of landscaped units. A number of other major companies have premises.

Marking the western border of the Upper Halliford/Charlton parts of Sunbury ecclesiastical and historic parish, however no longer by the town, is the Queen Mary Reservoir which was constructed 1914–25 and is home to a sailing club regularly used by schools and youth organisations to teach water sports.

Landmarks

Anglican church

St Mary's Church was built originally in the medieval period, to which its foundations date. It was entirely rebuilt in 1752, designed by Stephen Wright (Clerk of Works to Hampton Court Palace); it has a tall apsidal (dome-like) chancel with a south chapel and western extensions to aisles added in extensive remodelling designed by architect Samuel Sanders Teulon in 1857. A solitary central monument in the church itself is to Lady Jane Coke (died 1761), stained glass and a vestry much extended in the early 20th century. It is a listed building in the mid-category, Grade II*.

Sunbury Court
Sunbury Court in Lower Sunbury (b.1723) is the home of the high council of the Salvation Army since 1925.

Hawke House
Sunbury has the main home, Hawke House, of Admiral Hawke who blockaded Rochefort in 1757 and in 1758 he directed the blockade of Brest for six months. Its three parts are Georgian buildings with small gardens to front and rear. The vast bulk of the land behind and across the road belonging to the house was re-planned in stages in the mid 20th century as private detached homes with gardens.

Millennium Embroidery
Its own modernist gallery contains the wall-dominating commissioned artwork, a substantial tapestry, that commemorates Sunbury's ascension to the third millennium. It was designed by John Stamp and David Brown to be a large patchwork of Sunbury landmarks, including St. Mary's Church, the Admiral Hawke/Hawke House and the river. The finished piece is actually composed of several embroideries, the largest of which measures . It took four years to complete and enlisted the help of over 140 volunteers and artists. 
Queen Elizabeth II visited the Embroidery in 2001 and the gallery built for it in 2006.

Wheatley's Ait

This residential island of Sunbury is one of the longest on the River Thames and is divided into two sections by a storm weir. It is connected by a wide footbridge. The main weir, maintained and owned by the Environment Agency, connects the downstream end of the island to Sunbury Lock Ait, which is almost uninhabited, and is within the modern parish bounds of Walton and has the Middle Thames Yachting and Motorboat Club.

Sunbury Court Island

Sunbury Court Island, as with most of Sunbury's riverside, privately owned, is another residential island, connected by a narrow arched footbridge well above river level.

Sunbury House
An abortive proposal for this western part of the manor was designed by Sir Christopher Wren to be the local army barracks but not built. Sunbury House was a large building with gardens and allotments covering the rectangle of land between Thames Street, Green Street, Forge Lane and Halliford Road. It was leased in 1855 by the Bishop family, who had owned it since its 1789 commencement of construction for Charles Bishop, HM Procurator General, to Captain Auguste Frederic Lendy, a French officer, who, with the assistance of the exiled French Royal family (living at Orleans House) founded a military academy.

This was a period when military commissions were still bought and sold, and training of officers in the army itself was quite rudimentary, so these establishments existed to teach students the necessary skills before taking up their posts.

On New Year's Eve 1915 the house was largely destroyed by fire and the two wings survived. One of these was later demolished, the remaining large west wing becoming a nursing home in two parts: Sunbury House which has not yet been listed and West Lodge almost entirely late 18th century and a building listed in the initial category at Grade II.

Education

State schools

Primary schools
The town has six primary schools:
 Chennestone Primary School

Founded in the 1950s as Manor Lane Primary School. In 1967 the school changed its name to Chennestone to reflect the name of one of four manors in the parish, as spelt in the Domesday Book, when its pronunciation as with "Chent" in that book (Kent) would have been close to Kenyngton, its other form soon after recorded and its eventual form, Kempton.
 Beauclerc Infants School (federated with above)
 Hawkedale Infants School
 Kenyngton Manor School
 St Ignatius RC Primary School
 Springfield Primary School

Secondary schools
St. Paul's Catholic College, voluntary aided
Sunbury Manor School, Foundation school, a specialist humanities school
The Bishop Wand Church of England School, voluntary aided

Independent schools
Selective secondary independent schools (of approximately equal distance of less than three miles from the centre) are Hampton School (for boys) and Lady Eleanor Holles School (for girls) in Hampton, Sir William Perkins's School (for girls) in Chertsey, Halliford School (for boys) in Shepperton and St James Senior Boys School in Ashford. Local Preparatory Schools include Hampton Preparatory School, formerly Denmead School in Hampton, (part of the Hampton School Trust), Newland House School in Twickenham, Twickenham Preparatory School in Hampton, and Staines Preparatory School in Staines-upon-Thames. An alternative, progressive form of independent education for boys and girls aged 3 to 18, is provided by St Michael Steiner School in Hanworth Park.

Leisure

Sport and fitness
The Hazelwood Centre home of London Irish Amateur Rugby Club and training grounds and headquarters of London Irish
Sunbury cricket club
Sunbury and Walton Hawks Hockey Club
Nuffield Health Club (private sector membership club)
Everyone Active Sunbury Leisure Centre (private-public enterprise)

Other
Kempton Park Racecourse – National Hunt and Flat horse racing, November fair with fireworks and reindeer racing
1st–4th Sunbury Scouts/Guides
West Surrey Racing – touring car racing
862 (Sunbury) Air Training Corps
Sunbury Riding School – horse riding

River Thames
Sunbury Skiff and Punting Club and Sunbury Amateur Regatta
Licensed rod fishing
Motor boat hire

Sharing a border
Hampton & Kempton steam train children's railway 
Kempton Park Steam Engines museum
Staines Rugby Football Club
Middle Thames Yacht (motorboat) club
Walton Rowing Club
Walton Casuals Football Club

Within historic boundary
Sunbury Golf Club

Entertainment
The Riverside Arts Centre: theatre, amateur dramatics society; classical, jazz and blues music (see above)
Live music at public houses (see above)

In literature
The riverside St Mary's Anglican Church and the Ferry House nearby are mentioned in the book Oliver Twist by Charles Dickens.

Sunbury's islands and the ardour of rowing up Sunbury backwater (weir stream) to access the public riverside are mentioned in Three Men in a Boat by Jerome K. Jerome.

Sunbury is the setting for the 1890 novel Kit and Kitty by R. D. Blackmore.

Sunbury is passed through briefly in H.G. Wells's The War of the Worlds, where it is described to have been partially covered in heavy, inky vapour by the Martians.

Sunbury is mentioned in the opening chapter of Rural Rides by farmers' champion William Cobbett: "All Middlesex is ugly, notwithstanding the millions upon millions which it is continually sucking up from the rest of the kingdom; and though the Thames and its meadows now-and-then are seen from the road, the country is not less ugly from Richmond to Chertsey-bridge, through Twickenham, Hampton, Sunbury and Sheperton [sic], than it is elsewhere. The soil is a gravel at bottom with a black loam at top near the Thames; further back it is a sort of spewy gravel; and, the buildings consist generally of tax-eaters showy, tea-garden-like boxes, and of shabby dwellings of labouring people, who in this part of the country look to be about half Saint Giles's: dirty, and have every appearance of drinking gin." A few years after Cobbett's death Thomas Babington wrote in 1843, "An acre in Middlesex is worth a principality in Utopia" which contrasts neatly with its agricultural caricature.

Notable people

Demography and housing

The average level of accommodation in the region composed of detached houses was 28%, the average that was apartments was 22.6%.

The proportion of households in the settlement who owned their home outright compares to the regional average of 35.1%. The proportion who owned their home with a loan compares to the regional average of 32.5%. The remaining % is made up of rented dwellings (plus a negligible % of households living rent-free).

Nearest places

Transport

Road
A316, becomes the start of the M3 motorway.
A308, directions towards Staines-upon-Thames and Kingston-upon-Thames.
A244, directions towards Hounslow and Walton-on-Thames.

Rail
 Sunbury
 Kempton Park

Bus
Although Sunbury is officially outside London, it is predominantly served by three Transport for London bus routes: 
216 (Staines-upon-Thames – Kingston upon Thames)
235 (starts at Sunbury and runs to North Brentford Quarter)
290 (Staines-upon-Thames – Twickenham; serves Sunbury Cross).

In addition, two other local bus routes serve Sunbury:
555 (Hatton Cross Station – Walton-on-Thames)
557 (Heathrow Terminal 5 – Woking)

Air
Heathrow Airport is 5 miles away from its centre.

Emergency services
Sunbury is served by these emergency services:
Surrey Police (it was within the boundary of the Metropolitan Police district until 2000).
South East Coast Ambulance Service as of 1 July 2006, formed from the former Surrey Ambulance Service, Sussex, and Kent Ambulance services.
Surrey Fire & Rescue Service.

Namesakes
Sunbury, the suburb of Melbourne, Victoria, Australia.

Sunbury, Pennsylvania, a city (town in UK standards) in Northumberland County.

Notes and references
Notes 

References

External links

 Lower Sunbury conservation area
 The Lower Sunbury Residents Association (LOSRA)
 St Mary's
 Salvation Army Sunbury news page
 London Irish Amateur Rugby Football Club

 
Towns in Surrey
Places formerly in Middlesex
Populated places on the River Thames
Unparished areas in Surrey
Churches on the Thames
Borough of Spelthorne